Ctenomorphodes is an invalid genus of stick insects. There are four species in the genus, all found in Australia.

 Ctenomorphodes aliena
 Ctenomorphodes briareus
 Ctenomorphodes chronus
 Ctenomorphodes tessulatus (new name: Anchiale austrotessulata)

This genus is a synonym of the genus Anchiale.

External links
Phasmid Study Group: Anchiale

Phasmatodea genera